Star Kid (originally titled The Warrior of Waverly Street) is a 1997 American superhero film directed and written by Manny Coto and starring Joseph Mazzello, Richard Gilliland, and Corinne Bohrer.

Plot
The life of shy, seventh-grader Spencer Griffith, who has a crush on a schoolmate named Michelle, changes one night when he sees a mysterious meteorite, as it crashes down into a nearby junkyard. Sneaking out of his house to investigate, he discovers the meteorite to actually be a small rocket carrying a "Cybersuit", a prototype exoskeletal-suit with AI (short for Artificial intelligence) from another galaxy. He decides to try it on and melds with it, but requires some time to adjust to the experience, including the new speed and strength, and then starts testing out its various primary functions and abilities, deciding to call it "Cy". He proceeds to go around town doing whatever he wants, starting with getting back at a bully named Turbo, then saving Michelle and her friends from a damaged Rock-O-Plane and ordering food from a fast-food restaurant drive-thru. He also endures the hilarious antics of trashing part of his house after getting his head stuck inside the refrigerator, discovering the unappealing way that it will allow him to eat his take-out food, and finding a way to pee when it won't let him out to do so.

Meanwhile, Earth is visited by a Broodwarrior, a member of an alien race of world-conquering insectoids that are currently waging a war against the suit's creator, Tenris De'Thar, and his fellow Trelkins, who developed it as a weapon to turn the tide of the war, but was forced to launch it into space due to a Broodwarrior attack. The Broodwarrior's mission is to find and capture it so his race can analyze it. After first encountering the Broodwarrior, Spencer escapes, forces the suit to let him out, and abandons it, afraid he might not "live to see his next birthday" if he "engages" the Broodwarrior. Back home, after looking over one of his comic books titled MidKnight Warrior and thinking about what the title character, in his situation, would do, he goes back out to find the suit. He unexpectedly finds himself accompanied by Turbo, who gradually becomes his friend, only to find the Broodwarrior has taken the suit. They head to the junkyard, where it is about to be taken off-world by the Broodwarrior, and create a plan to distract it long enough to allow Spencer to rescue the suit. Spencer retrieves it and begins battling the Broodwarrior.

During the battle, the Broodwarrior gets the upper hand, and the suit is bashed multiple times by the Broodwarrior's mace, severely damaging it, and forcing it to eject Spencer before it goes completely offline. Spencer covers it with scrap metal to hide it from the Broodwarrior, takes a piece of it, and continues to fight the Broodwarrior, who had started trying to chase down Turbo. Spencer confronts the Broodwarrior before getting chased himself and is suddenly cornered inside a junked ice cream truck. Just when the Broodwarrior is about to dispose of Spencer, Turbo finds a control panel and activates the car crusher the truck is sitting in, revealing the chase into it to be part of a trap. Spencer escapes while the truck is compressed into a solid metal cube, killing the Broodwarrior.

With the Broodwarrior now destroyed, Spencer and Turbo return to the suit but it appears that they were too late to save it. Just as Spencer begins to lose hope, Tenris De'Thar and a small group of Trelkin soldiers appear from a giant UFO orbiting Earth and quickly repair it, reviving it. After Spencer says goodbye to it, the head alien soldier gives him a badge for his bravery and courage before their departure back to their home-world, and the long, eventful night finally comes to an end. The next day at school, a now confident Spencer, encouraged by Turbo, starts up a conversation with Michelle.

Cast
Joseph Mazzello as Spencer Griffith
Richard Gilliland as Roland Griffith
Corinne Bohrer as Janet Holloway
Alex Daniels as "Cy"
Arthur Burghardt as "Cy" (voice)
Joey Simmrin as Manfred "Turbo" Bruntley
Brian Simpson as the Broodwarrior
Ashlee Levitch as Stacey Griffith
Jack McGee as Hank Bruntley
Danny Masterson as Kevin
Lauren Eckstrom as Michelle Eberhardt
Bobby Porter - Nath the Trelkin
Larry Nicholas - Tenris De-Thar the Trelkin
Rusty Hanson - Trelkin
Terry Castillo - Trelkin
Christine Weatherup - Nadia
Yumi Adachi - Mika

Production
The film was part of an effort by Trimark to enter into larger films. At the 1995 American Film Market, it was positioned as Trimark's flagship product when it was previewed to foreign distributors under its original title, The Warrior of Waverly Street

Release
The film grossed a domestic total of $7,029,025, making it a box office bomb from its estimated $12 million budget.

Critical reception
On the review aggregator website Rotten Tomatoes, the film holds an approval rating of 43% with an average rating of 5.37/10 based on 14 reviews. In his review for the Chicago Sun-Times, Roger Ebert (who gave it 3 out of 4 stars) said, "Star Kid, written and directed by Manny Coto, has a sweet heart and a lot of sly wit, and the symbiosis between boy and cyborg is handled cleverly. For kids of a certain age, it pushes the right buttons."

Home media
In the United States, the film was released on VHS and DVD format in 1998. It was also released on VHS in the UK and is now available on DVD.

Soundtrack
All tracks (with the exception of the first two tracks) were composed by Nicholas Pike. The soundtrack was released on compact disc by Sonic Images (January 27, 1998) and further released for download through BSX Records (January 29, 2013) with modified cover art.

Comic
A prequel was released in comic book form, written by Manny Coto with art by John Stokes. It was published by Dark Horse Comics.

See also
List of films featuring powered exoskeletons

References

External links

1997 films
1990s adventure films
1990s coming-of-age films
1990s superhero films
American independent films
American children's adventure films
American children's fantasy films
American coming-of-age films
American science fantasy films
American superhero films
Films about bullying
Films about dysfunctional families
Films directed by Manny Coto
Films scored by Nicholas Pike
Films set in Los Angeles
Films shot in Los Angeles
Superhero comedy films
Teen superhero films
Trimark Pictures films
1990s English-language films
1990s American films